Katok Mga Misis is a Philippine television talk show broadcast by GMA Network. Hosted by Giovanni Calvo, Ali Sotto, Sanjay Acosta and Bayani Agbayani, it premiered on July 31, 1995. The show concluded on June 5, 1998.

Hosts
 Ali Sotto
 Bayani Agbayani
 Arnell Ignacio
 Sanjay Acosta
 Ai-Ai delas Alas (reliever of Ali Sotto)
 Jackie Lou Blanco (reliever of Ali Sotto or Arnell Ignacio)
 Giovanni Calvo

References

External links
 

1995 Philippine television series debuts
1998 Philippine television series endings
Filipino-language television shows
GMA Network original programming
Philippine television talk shows